David Goodman (born 31 August 1958) is an Australian Paralympic athlete with a vision impairment born in London, England. He participated but did not win a medal at the 1984 New York/Stoke Mandeville Games. He won a  gold medal at the 1988 Seoul Games in the Men's 100 m B3 event. He also participated but did not win any medals at the 1992 Barcelona and 1996 Atlanta Games. He also played blind cricket, and was in the Australian team for the Blind World Cup in 1998.

References

External links
 
 David Goodman at Australian Athletics Historical Results
 

Paralympic athletes of Australia
Athletes (track and field) at the 1984 Summer Paralympics
Athletes (track and field) at the 1988 Summer Paralympics
Athletes (track and field) at the 1992 Summer Paralympics
Athletes (track and field) at the 1996 Summer Paralympics
Medalists at the 1988 Summer Paralympics
Paralympic gold medalists for Australia
Visually impaired sprinters
Athletes from London
English emigrants to Australia
Australian cricketers
Blind cricketers
Australian blind people
1958 births
Living people
Paralympic medalists in athletics (track and field)
Australian male sprinters
20th-century Australian people
21st-century Australian people